Baron Willem Johan Gijsbert Gevers (11 January 1911 – 23 May 1994), lord of Kethel en Spaland, was a Dutch nobleman and diplomat who competed in the mid-1930s in bobsledding.

Gevers was born in Berlin, son of the Dutch Envoy to Germany Willem Alexander Frederik Gevers. At the 1936 Winter Olympics in Garmisch-Partenkirchen, he finished tenth in the two-man event.  He later became Dutch Ambassador to the United Kingdom. He died, aged 83, in Monaco.

References

 1936 bobsleigh two-man results
 Willem Barongevers' profile at Sports Reference.com

1911 births
1994 deaths
Ambassadors of the Netherlands to the United Kingdom
Bobsledders at the 1936 Winter Olympics
Dutch nobility
Olympic bobsledders of the Netherlands
Dutch male bobsledders